The 1954 Cornell Big Red football team was an American football team that represented Cornell University as an independent during the 1954 college football season. In its eighth season under head coach George K. James, the team compiled a 5–4 record and outscored its opponents 194 to 153. Guy Bedrossian was the team captain. 

Cornell played its home games at Schoellkopf Field in Ithaca, New York.

Schedule

References

Cornell
Cornell Big Red football seasons
Cornell Big Red football